The Lord of the Rings is a film series of three epic fantasy adventure films directed by Peter Jackson. The films, subtitled The Fellowship of the Ring, The Two Towers, and The Return of the King, were released serially worldwide between December 2001 and December 2003. They are based on J. R. R. Tolkien's epic fantasy novel, The Lord of the Rings, adapted for the screen by Jackson, Fran Walsh, and Philippa Boyens. Set in Tolkien's fictional Middle-earth, the plot follows the hobbit Frodo Baggins and his fellow members of the Fellowship of the Ring as they embark on a quest to destroy the One Ring, which will rid Middle-earth of the Dark Lord Sauron. A large ensemble cast was featured in the series, which included Elijah Wood, Ian McKellen, Viggo Mortensen, Sean Astin, Orlando Bloom, Liv Tyler, John Rhys-Davies, Sean Bean, Billy Boyd, Dominic Monaghan, Andy Serkis, Cate Blanchett, Christopher Lee, Hugo Weaving, Ian Holm, John Noble, Bernard Hill, David Wenham, Miranda Otto, Karl Urban, Craig Parker, Marton Csokas, and Brad Dourif.

All three films premiered to widespread critical acclaim. The Toronto Film Critics Association awarded Jackson a "Special Citation" for his work on the series as a whole, while the Austin Film Critics Association selected the entire series as the decade's third best film. The films won seventeen out of thirty Academy Award nominations, and The Return of the King holds the record for most Oscars with eleven alongside Titanic and Ben-Hur. The Return of the King also has the distinction of being the only fantasy film until The Shape of Water (2017) to have won the Academy Award for Best Picture.

In addition to receiving the Screen Actors Guild Award for Outstanding Performance by a Cast in a Motion Picture and National Board of Review Award for Best Cast, many of the actors were also recognized for their individual work, including McKellen (12 nominations), Serkis (10 nominations), Astin (9 nominations), and Mortensen (5 nominations). Composer Howard Shore received recognition for his original score, as he was the recipient of three Academy Awards, two BAFTA nominations, and three Grammy Awards in addition to a number of other awards. The series also received accolades in various technical categories, including those in editing, sound mixing, and visual effects. Walsh, Boyens, and Jackson's screenwriting earned them 10 awards out of 23 total nominations, including the Academy Award for Best Adapted Screenplay (for The Return of the King). In total, the series received 475 awards out of 800 nominations, thus making the films the most awarded film series in cinematic history.

The Fellowship of the Ring

The Lord of the Rings: The Fellowship of the Ring was released in theatres worldwide on 19 December 2001. Faced with a production budget of $93 million, the first film earned a worldwide gross of $871,530,324. As in the rest of the series, The Fellowship of the Ring had a large ensemble cast, introducing Elijah Wood, Ian McKellen, Viggo Mortensen, Sean Astin, Orlando Bloom, Liv Tyler, John Rhys-Davies, Sean Bean, Billy Boyd, Dominic Monaghan, Cate Blanchett, Christopher Lee, Hugo Weaving, Ian Holm, and Andy Serkis. The first film's plot follows Frodo Baggins (Wood) and the rest of the Fellowship of the Ring as they begin their journey to destroy the One Ring and defeat the Dark Lord Sauron once and for all.

According to film site aggregator Rotten Tomatoes, 91 percent of critics were favourable about The Fellowship of the Ring. Entertainment Weekly columnist Lisa Schwarzbaum called the film "thrilling – a great picture, a triumphant picture, a joyfully conceived work of cinema that (based on this first installment, with two more ready for release in the next two years) would appear to embrace Tolkien's classic with love and delight, and rewards both adepts and novices with the highest compliment of all: an intelligence and artistry as a movie independent of blind fidelity to the page." Nev Pierce of BBC added, "Funny, scary and, totally involving, Peter Jackson's assured adaptation of J. R. R Tolkien's The Lord of The Rings turns the book's least screen-worthy volume into a gripping and powerful adventure movie."

The Fellowship of the Ring received thirteen Academy Award nominations, winning in four categories. It also earned thirteen nominations at the 55th British Academy Film Awards, leading to wins in the categories for Best Film, Best Direction, Best Special Visual Effects, and the Orange Film of the Year Award. Other notable ceremonies where it received much recognition included the American Film Institute Awards, the Broadcast Film Critics Association Awards, the Empire Awards, the Golden Globes, the MTV Movie Awards, the Satellite Awards, and Saturn Awards. Various critics groups, such as those in Chicago and Phoenix also awarded the film. In total, The Fellowship of the Ring received 98 awards out of 152 nominations.

The Two Towers

The worldwide theatrical release of The Lord of the Rings: The Two Towers occurred on 18 December 2002. The series' second film earned a worldwide gross of $926,047,111 based on a production budget of $94 million. The film introduced new characters played by Bernard Hill, Miranda Otto, Karl Urban, David Wenham, and Brad Dourif.

The Two Towers received critical acclaim; film site aggregator Rotten Tomatoes reported that 96 percent of critics were positive. CNN film critic Paul Clinton called The Two Towers an "utter triumph", and writer Philip French of The Guardian noted in a review of the second film that "these Tolkien films have a weight and seriousness that very few sword-and-sorcery pictures of the past 30-odd years have attained." Writing for Entertainment Weekly, Owen Gleiberman remarked "The Two Towers conjures an illusion of the gravity that you want from an emotionally charged storybook epic. Really, though, what it comes down to is superbly staged battle scenes and moral alliances forged in earnest yet purged of the wit and dynamic, bristly ego that define true on-screen personality." The film was also listed on a number of critics' lists; Dallas-Fort Worth Film Critics named The Two Towers 2002's third best film, while Central Ohio Film Critics named The Two Towers that year's fifth best film and Southeastern Film Critics ranked it the eighth.

The Two Towers won two out of six Academy Award nominations and three accolades out of ten nominations at the 56th British Academy Film Awards. Like its predecessor, the second film also received recognition at the American Film Institute Awards, the Broadcast Film Critics Association Awards, the Empire Awards, the Golden Globes, the MTV Movie Awards, the Satellite Awards, and the Saturn Awards. Various critics groups, such as Chicago, Phoenix, and Seattle also awarded the film. In total, The Two Towers received 136 awards out of 222 nominations.

The Return of the King

The worldwide theatrical release of The Lord of the Rings: The Return of the King occurred on 17 December 2003. The series' third film earned a worldwide gross of $1,119,929,521 off a production budget of $94 million and became the second highest worldwide grossing until James Cameron's Avatar released in 2009. In addition to containing most of the cast from the previous two films, The Return of the King introduced Denethor, the Steward of Gondor, played by John Noble (though the character appeared in the extended edition of The Two Towers).

The Return of the King continued the series' critical success, with Rotten Tomatoes reporting that 93% of critics had given the film a positive review. Roger Ebert of the Chicago Sun-Times believed the film to be the best of the three, as it "certifies the Ring trilogy as a work of bold ambition at a time of cinematic timidity." Entertainment Weekly film critic Lisa Schwarzbaum was equally praiseworthy of the final chapter. She explained, "I can't think of another film trilogy that ends in such glory, or another monumental work of sustained storytelling that surges ahead with so much inventiveness and ardor. The conclusion of Peter Jackson's masterwork is passionate and literate, detailed and expansive, and it's conceived with a risk-taking flair for old-fashioned movie magic at its most precious, a rarity now that CGI prowess has fallen into the hands of run-of-the-mill studio ring-chasers." The Guardians Peter Bradshaw wrote, "With enormous energy and a passionately exacting eye for detail, Jackson has made the regressive-romantic legend live again. He has given the Tolkien myth a turbo-charged rush into the 21st century."

The film won eleven Academy Awards (from eleven nominations), tying Titanic and Ben-Hur for the most Oscars won, as well as setting a new record for the highest clean sweep at the Oscars (which it still holds to this day). The Return of the King also became the first fantasy film to have won the Academy Award for Best Picture. The Return of the King won five BAFTAs, three Empire Awards, four Golden Globes, one Satellite Award, and eight Saturn Awards, among others. In total, the film received 258 awards out of 337 nominations.

See also

 List of accolades received by The Hobbit film series
 2001 in film
 2002 in film
 2003 in film
 List of films considered the best
 List of highest-grossing films

References
General

 
 
 

Specific

External links

 
 
 

Lord of the Rings
Middle-earth lists
List of accolades
Warner Bros. Discovery-related lists